The Fitod is a left tributary of the river Olt in Romania. It flows into the Olt in Jigodin-Băi. The Șuta Dam is built on this river.

References

Rivers of Romania
Rivers of Harghita County